is a former Japanese football player.

Club statistics

Honours 
Air Force Central
Thai Division 1 League: 2013

References

External links

1979 births
Living people
Association football people from Saitama Prefecture
Japanese footballers
J1 League players
J2 League players
Japan Football League (1992–1998) players
Japan Football League players
Honda FC players
Ventforet Kofu players
Roasso Kumamoto players
Jun Uruno
Jun Uruno
Expatriate footballers in Thailand
Japanese expatriate sportspeople in Thailand
Association football forwards